S. Selvamohandas Pandian is an Indian politician. He was elected to Tamil Nadu legislative assembly from Tenkasi constituency in 2016 as an AIADMK candidate.

References 

Living people
Year of birth missing (living people)
Tamil Nadu MLAs 2016–2021
All India Anna Dravida Munnetra Kazhagam politicians